Macedon or Macedonia was a kingdom in ancient Greece.

Macedon or Makedon may also refer to:
 Makedon (mythology), legendary ancestor of the ancient Macedonians
 Fillia Makedon, Greek-American computer scientist

Places

Australia
 Macedon, Victoria
 Macedon railway station, Victoria
 Mount Macedon, a mountain, part of the Macedon Ranges in Macedon Regional Park
 Mount Macedon, Victoria, a town
 Electoral district of Macedon, an electoral district in Victoria

United States
 Macedon (town), New York
 Macedon (village), New York
 Macedon, Ohio

See also
Macedonia (disambiguation)
Macedonian (disambiguation)